Kabitirtha Assembly constituency was a Legislative Assembly constituency of South 24 Parganas district in the Indian state of West Bengal.

Overview
As a consequence of the orders of the Delimitation Commission, Kabitirtha Assembly constituency ceases to exist from 2011.
 
It was part of Jadavpur (Lok Sabha constituency).

Members of Legislative Assembly

Election results

1977-2006
In the 2006, 2001 and 1996 state assembly elections, Ram Pyare Ram of Congress won the 147 Kabitirtha assembly seat defeating his nearest rival Moinuddin Shams of Forward Bloc in all the three years. Kalimuddin Shams of Forward Bloc defeated Ram Pyare Ram of Congress in 1991. Ram Pyare Ram of Congress defeated Kalimuddin Shams of Forward Bloc in 1987. Kalimuddin Shams of Forward Bloc defeated Saugata Roy of ICS in 1982 and Ram Pyare Ram of Congress in 1977.

1967-1972
Ram Peary Ram of Congress won in 1972 and 1971, Kalimuddin Shams of Forward Bloc won in 1969. B.B.Paul of Congress won in 1967.

1951-1962 Ekbalpore-Watgunge
In 1962 and 1957, there was a seat at Ekbalpore. Narendra Nath Sen of Congress won in both the years. In independent India’s first election in 1951 Kali Mukherjee of Congress won the Watgunge seat.

References

Former assembly constituencies of West Bengal
Politics of South 24 Parganas district